Rodolfo Wagner was a Chilean sprinter. He competed in the men's 100 metres at the 1928 Summer Olympics.

References

External links
 

Year of birth missing
Possibly living people
Athletes (track and field) at the 1928 Summer Olympics
Chilean male sprinters
Olympic athletes of Chile
Place of birth missing
20th-century Chilean people